Outpost Magazine is a Canadian adventure-travel publication based out of Toronto, Ontario. Published six times a year, it is known for its longform adventure narratives from across the world, often with a Canadian perspective.

History
The first issue of Outpost was published in April 1996.

In 2002, it won Magazine of the Year at the Canadian National Magazine Awards, the largest prize for a Canadian magazine.

Outpost has distinguished itself in the travel world by sending teams of travel writers and photographers on large-scale multi-day expeditions, eventually labeled "opXpeditions," to various countries such as Colombia, Jordan and Taiwan. These trips occasionally take on a specific mission, such as retracing the Franklin's lost expedition in Nunavut.

In 2007, the magazine launched its Global Travel Guide, which spotlights some of the most interesting trips and tours found from around the world.

Over the years, Outpost has hosted many events in and around Toronto, including the highly publicized "Outpost Magazine Celebrates Jordan".

Notable contributors 
 Evan Solomon, Canadian political commentator, anchor and columnist with Maclean's magazine
 Les Stroud, producer, host and director of Survivorman
 Jeff Fuchs, mountaineer and writer
 Ian Wright (traveller), comedian
 Christopher Frey, journalist
 Scott Wilson, host of Departures (TV series)
 Bruce Kirkby, Canadian adventurer, writer and photographer
 Simon Vaughan, travel-industry expert and editor 
 Ryan Murdock, travel writer
 Sue Bedford, memoirist and traveller

Awards 
Outpost has been nominated for dozens of Canadian National Magazine Awards, winning National Magazine of the Year in 2002. In addition, its contributors have earned the publication four gold medals, three silver medals and 19 honorable mentions. Many of the staff at Outpost are regarded as experts in the field, and are frequently interviewed in public issues, in and around Canadian travel.

References

External links
 

1996 establishments in Ontario
Bi-monthly magazines published in Canada
Magazines established in 1996
Magazines published in Toronto
Travel magazines published in Canada